Yeah Yeah Yeahs is the debut EP by American indie rock band Yeah Yeah Yeahs, released in 2001 by the band's own label, Shifty. It is sometimes incorrectly called Master due to the prominence of a necklace bearing that word on the album's cover. It reached number 1 on the UK Indie Chart. As of 2009, sales in the United States have exceeded 71,000 copies, according to Nielsen SoundScan. The EP was named NMEs second best single of 2002.

Track listing

The track "Our Time" interpolates the Tommy James and the Shondells song "Crimson and Clover"; when Karen O sings "It's the year to be hated / So glad that we made it," the melody is taken from the hit song, which reached #1 on the U.S. Billboard Hot 100 in 1969.

Personnel
 Brian Chase – drums
 Nick Zinner – guitars
 Karen O – vocals

Production
Crispin – artwork
Chuck Scott – mastering
Jerry Teel – engineer

References

External links
 

2001 debut EPs
Yeah Yeah Yeahs albums